The Church of St Conan is an Anglican church on the A389 road near Washaway in Egloshayle, Cornwall, England, UK.

History
Built at a cost of £490 with designs by James Arthur Reeve of Norwich, the church was opened for worship on 23 July 1883. Gill and Cleave of Egloshayle were the stonemasons, Mr Williams of Egloshayle was the carpenter, and Mr Evans of the firm of Doney and Evans provided the granite work.

It reportedly has an ancient font of Saxon origin. This font came from Lanteglos-by-Camelford; it is similar to one at Morwenstow but has much decoration of a Celtic character. Nikolaus Pevsner dated it as c. 1100 or earlier. There is a fine pulpit, possibly of German workmanship.

The church became a Grade II listed building on 4 November 1988.

The saint to whom the church is dedicated may have been Conan who was associated with St Petroc; another possibility is that he is Conan who was Bishop of St Germans in the 930s. St Conan's feast is celebrated on 23 July.

Parish status

The church is in a joint parish with:
St Breoke's Church, St Breock, Wadebridge
St Petroc's Church, Egloshayle
St Mary's at the Betjeman Centre, Wadebridge

References

Church of England church buildings in Cornwall
Grade II listed churches in Cornwall
Churches completed in 1883